Lotus is an unincorporated community in Center Township, Union County, in the U.S. state of Indiana.

History
A post office was established at Lotus in 1865, and remained in operation until it was discontinued in 1903.

Geography

References

Unincorporated communities in Union County, Indiana
Unincorporated communities in Indiana